Mukku Raju (Sagiraju Rajamraju)  was a Tollywood film	choreographer and actor. Raju started his career as choreographer in Tamil Cinema / Kollywood, but ended as an actor and has acted in over 1000 films. He also directed and wrote scripts for a few films. He started a dancers associations in Madras, later moved to Hyderabad and co-founded the Telugu Dancers and Directors Association, to support and help the budding directors and dancers. He received the Nandi Award for Best Character Actor in 2008 for his film 1940 Lo Oka Gramam (A Village in 1940).

Raju was also an Ayurveda practitioner and a Multilinguist and was best known by the name Sagi Rajan Raju in his hometown, Kumudavalli.

Raju passed at the age of 83 after a short illness, and his funeral took place at Cherukuvada.

Filmography 

Other films like Erra Sainyam, Orey Rikshaw and Cheemala Dandu were some of his popular movies. He played important roles in movies directed by R. Narayana Murthy. He choreographed for legendary actors NTR and Sivaji Ganesan.

Awards
He received the Nandi Award for Best Character Actor in 2008 for the film 1940 Lo Oka Gramam.

Death
Raju died on 31 July 2014 due to ill health in Bhimavaram, West Godavari district.

References 

Telugu male actors
People from West Godavari district
Nandi Award winners
2014 deaths
1931 births
Indian male film actors
Male actors from Andhra Pradesh
Male actors in Telugu cinema
20th-century Indian male actors
21st-century Indian male actors